

Champions

Major League Baseball
World Series: New York Yankees over Atlanta Braves (4-0); Mariano Rivera, MVP

American League Championship Series MVP: Orlando Hernández
American League Division Series:
National League Championship Series MVP: Eddie Pérez
National League Division Series
All-Star Game, July 13 at Fenway Park: American League, 4–1; Pedro Martínez, MVP

Other champions
Caribbean World Series: Tigres del Licey (Dominican Republic)
College World Series: Miami (Florida)
Cuban National Series: Santiago de Cuba over Industriales
European Championship: Netherlands over Italy (3-0)
Japan Series: Fukuoka Daiei Hawks over Chunichi Dragons (4-1)
Korean Series: Hanwha Eagles over Lotte Giants (4-1)
Big League World Series: Orlando, Florida
Junior League World Series: Arroyo, Puerto Rico
Little League World Series: Hirakata, Osaka, Japan
Senior League World Series: Conway, Florida
Pan American Games: Cuba over USA (5-1)
Taiwan Series: Wei Chuan Dragons over Koos Group Whales

Awards and honors
Baseball Hall of Fame
George Brett
Orlando Cepeda
Nestor Chylak
Nolan Ryan
Frank Selee
Joe Williams
Robin Yount
Most Valuable Player
Iván Rodríguez (AL) Texas Rangers
Chipper Jones (NL) Atlanta Braves
Cy Young Award
Pedro Martínez (AL) Boston Red Sox
Randy Johnson (NL) Arizona Diamondbacks
Rookie of the Year Award
Carlos Beltrán (AL) Kansas City Royals
Scott Williamson (NL) Cincinnati Reds
Manager of the Year Award
Jimy Williams (AL) Boston Red Sox
Jack McKeon (NL) Cincinnati Reds
Woman Executive of the Year (major or minor league): Judy Ellis, Missoula Osprey, Pioneer League
Gold Glove Award
Rafael Palmeiro (1B) (AL)
Roberto Alomar (2B) (AL)
Scott Brosius (3B) (AL)
Omar Vizquel (SS) (AL)
Shawn Green (OF) (AL)
Ken Griffey Jr. (OF) (AL)
Bernie Williams (OF) (AL)
Iván Rodríguez (C) (AL)
Mike Mussina (P) (AL)
J. T. Snow (1B) (NL)
Pokey Reese (2B) (NL)
Robin Ventura (3B) (NL)
Rey Ordóñez (SS) (NL)
Steve Finley (OF) (NL)
Andruw Jones (OF) (NL)
Larry Walker (OF) (NL)
Mike Lieberthal (C) (NL)
Greg Maddux (P) (NL)

MLB statistical leaders

1American League Triple Crown Pitching Winner

Major League Baseball final standings

 The asterisk denotes the club that won the wild card for its respective league. The New York Mets defeated the Cincinnati Reds 5-0 in a one-game playoff to determine the NL wild card.

Events

January
January 5 – Nolan Ryan, George Brett and Robin Yount are elected to the Baseball Hall of Fame by the Baseball Writers' Association of America. It is the first time since  that three players are elected simultaneously on their first try. Carlton Fisk finishes 4th in the voting, missing election by 43 votes.
January 26 – The Oakland Athletics signed outfielder Tim Raines as a free agent.

February
February 2 – The San Diego Padres trade Greg Vaughn to the Cincinnati Reds.  Vaughn had hit 50 home runs for the Padres the previous season, making him the first player in major league history to be traded after a 50-homer season.
February 5 – MLB honors each league's best hitter with an award named after Hank Aaron. The all-time home run king learns about the honor on his 65th birthday at an event which includes US President Bill Clinton and Hall of Famers Ernie Banks and Reggie Jackson.
February 15 – The Cincinnati Reds announce that they are dropping their long-standing policy of no facial hair for players. The change is the result of a talk between Reds owner Marge Schott and newly acquired outfielder Greg Vaughn.
February 18:
The U.S. Postal Service issues a Jackie Robinson stamp as part of their "Celebrate the Century" program. Robinson is selected to represent the 1940s, and is the second baseball player chosen. Babe Ruth, chosen in May , represents the 1920s.
The Yankees end the trade rumors by acquiring Cy Young Award winner Roger Clemens from the Toronto Blue Jays in exchange for pitchers David Wells and Graeme Lloyd, and infielder Homer Bush.
February 21 – Florida Marlins rookie third baseman Mike Lowell, acquired from the New York Yankees on February 1, undergoes surgery for testicular cancer after a small mass is found during a routine exam.

March
March 2 – Orlando Cepeda, Frank Selee, Smokey Joe Williams and Nestor Chylak are elected to the Hall of Fame by the Veterans Committee.
March 7 – In a historic agreement, it is announced that the Baltimore Orioles travel to Cuba for a March 28 exhibition game against the Cuba national team in Havana. The Cuban team travels to the US for a return contest at a future date. It is the first time in 40 years that Americans play a professional game in Cuba.
March 10 – Yankees manager Joe Torre is diagnosed with prostate cancer. While he is undergoing treatment, the team is run by coach Don Zimmer.
March 21 – The Toronto Blue Jays signed pitcher Vicente Palacios, despite the fact he hadn't pitched on the professional level since 1995. He fails to stick with the team out of spring training, but later signs a minor league deal with the New York Mets. 
March 28 – The Orioles make the first visit to Cuba by major leaguers since , and defeat a team of Cuban amateurs by a score of 3–2 in 11 innings. Pitcher José Contreras hurls eight innings of 2–hit, 10–K ball in relief for the Cubans, while catcher Charles Johnson hits a two–run home run, and DH Harold Baines drives in the winning run for the Orioles. The two teams play a rematch at Camden Yards in Baltimore on May 3.

April
April 4 – In the first season opener ever played outside of the United States or Canada, the Colorado Rockies defeat the San Diego Padres, 8–2, before an overflow crowd of 27,104 in Monterrey, Mexico. Outfielder Dante Bichette has four hits, including a home run, and four RBI for the winners. Local hero Vinny Castilla also has four hits for the Rockies, while Darryl Kile picks up the victory.
April 11 – The Tampa Bay Devil Rays defeat the Boston Red Sox‚ 5–4‚ as pitcher Scott Aldred picks up the win in relief. The victory ends Aldred's major league record streak of 50 appearances without a win‚ loss or save.
April 19 – The Baltimore Orioles' Cal Ripken Jr. is placed on the disabled list for the first time in his 19–year career because of irritation in his lower back. Ripken's record consecutive game streak ended in September  at 2,632.
April 20:
Cincinnati Reds owner Marge Schott agrees to sell her controlling interest in the Reds to a group headed by Carl H. Lindner, ending her 14–year tenure. The group pays a total of $67 million.
The Nolan Ryan Museum opens in Alvin, Texas.
The Colorado Rockies postpone the first of 2 consecutive home games against the Montreal Expos in the aftermath of the Columbine High School massacre.
April 23:
The St. Louis Cardinals defeat the Los Angeles Dodgers 12–5, as third baseman Fernando Tatís sets a major league record by hitting two grand slams in a single inning. His two homers come in St. Louis' 11–run third inning. Tatís, with eight runs batted in, shattered the mark for an inning set 109 years before by Ed Cartwright, who drove seven runs in an inning while playing for the 1890 St. Louis Browns. After that, the modern-day six RBI mark for an inning was shared by Fred Merkle (NY Giants, 1911), Indian Bob Johnson (Philadelphia A's, 1937) and Jim Ray Hart (SF Giants, 1970). Besides, Dodgers pitcher Chan Ho Park becomes the first 20th century pitcher – and only the second ever – to surrender two grand slams in a single frame. The first is Bill Phillips of the Pittsburgh Pirates, who does so in 1890. Park is the 36th major-leaguer to serve up two grand slams to the same player in his career.
The Milwaukee Brewers sink the Pittsburgh Pirates, 9–1, as pitcher Steve Woodard hurls the complete game victory. The win ends Milwaukee's NL record streak of 113 games without a complete game.
April 28 – Larry Walker hits three home runs helping the Colorado Rockies beat the St. Louis Cardinals 9–7.

May
May 3:
In a 12–11, 10-inning loss to the Oakland Athletics, Boston Red Sox rookie Creighton Gubanich becomes only the fourth player to hit a grand slam for his first major league hit.
The Pittsburgh Pirates defeat the San Francisco Giants, 9–8. In a losing effort, Jeff Kent collects five hits for the Giants while hitting for the cycle. Kent is just the second player to do so in Three Rivers Stadium, joining Joe Torre, who did it on June 27, 1973.
May 9:
The New York Yankees defeat the Seattle Mariners 6–1. Reliever Mike Stanton makes his first major league start for the Yankees, ending his major league record streak of 552 consecutive relief appearances prior to his first start. The previous record of 443 is set by San Francisco Giants pitcher Gary Lavelle.
Florida St. junior second baseman Marshall McDougall goes 7-for-7, with an NCAA-record six consecutive home runs and 16 runs batted in, as the Seminoles defeat Maryland 26–2. McDougall opens the game with a single.
May 10 – The Boston Red Sox defeat the Seattle Mariners, 12–4, as shortstop Nomar Garciaparra leads the way with three home runs, including two grand slams. Garciaparra drives home 10 of Boston's runs as he slugs a bases-loaded grand slam in the 1st inning, a two-run shot in the 3rd, and another grand slam in the 8th. Fernando Tatís is the last player to do it, almost a month earlier.
May 12:
Pedro Martínez strikes out 15 batters for the second consecutive game in a Boston Red Sox 9–2 victory over the Seattle Mariners.
The Anaheim Angels shut out the New York Yankees, 1–0, behind the combined three-hit pitching of Chuck Finley and Troy Percival. Finley strikes out 11 Yankees in his eight innings of work, including four in the third inning. He is the 33rd pitcher in major league history to strike out four batters in a single frame.
May 17 – At Rangers Ballpark in Arlington, the Tampa Bay Devil Rays beat the Texas Rangers, 13–3, as Rays' first baseman Fred McGriff extends his major league record by hitting a home run in his 35th big league stadium.
May 19 – In a record-setting outing, the Cincinnati Reds beat the Colorado Rockies, 24–12, stroking 28 hits in the process. Seven players in the Reds lineup get three or more hits apiece and the 36 runs scored sets a Coors Field record. Cincinnati's Jeffrey Hammonds hits three home runs, while Sean Casey hits a pair of three-run homers to drive in six runs and reaches base in all seven plate appearances, tying a 20th-century record. In addition, teammate Mike Cameron ties a major league mark with eight plate appearances in a nine-inning game. The 36 runs scored in the contest represents the third-highest total in the major leagues since the turn of the 20th century, while the 81 total bases set a new major league standard. With 28 hits, the Reds tie a mark originally set on May 13, 1902, while tying the National League record with seven players with three or more hits matching the 1928 Pittsburgh Pirates (June 12) and the 1989 Cincinnati Reds (August 3). Colorado's Larry Walker extends his hitting streak to 20 games and raises his average to .431.
May 20 – The New York Mets sweep the Milwaukee Brewers in a doubleheader, winning the first game 11–10, and the second 10–1. Robin Ventura hits a grand slam in each contest, becoming the first player in major league history to do so in both ends of a doubleheader. Ventura also becomes the first player to hit a pair of grand slams on the same day on two separate occasions.

June
June 9 – New York Mets manager Bobby Valentine is ejected in the 12th inning of a 14 inning marathon with the Toronto Blue Jays when Mike Piazza gets called for catcher's interference on Craig Grebeck. An inning later, Valentine returns to the dugout in a disguise. Unamused, Major League Baseball fines Valentine $10,000 and suspends him three games. The Mets go on to win the game 4–3.
June 25:
The St. Louis Cardinals beat the Arizona Diamondbacks, 1–0, as rookie pitcher José Jiménez hurls the first no-hitter of the season. The Cardinals score the lone run on a broken bat single with two outs in the ninth inning. Jiménez posts eight strikeouts in the contest, while losing pitcher Randy Johnson strikes out 14, including the 2500th of his career.
Jesse Orosco of the Baltimore Orioles makes his 1,051st relief appearance to break Kent Tekulve's major league record.
June 26 – Sammy Sosa hits his 300th career home run.
June 27 – The Seattle Mariners defeat the Texas Rangers, 5–2, in the final game played at the Kingdome. Ken Griffey Jr. hits the final home run in the stadium's history.
June 28 – Hack Wilson ups his runs batted in total for the  season to 191. 69 years after the event, an RBI is added by the commissioner's office, which also gives Babe Ruth six additional walks, raising his career-record total to 2,062. "There is no doubt that Hack Wilson's RBI total should be 191", commissioner Bud Selig says. "I am sensitive to the historical significance that accompanies the correction of such a prestigious record, especially after so many years have passed, but it is important to get it right." The missing RBI comes from the second game of a doubleheader between Wilson's Chicago Cubs and the Cincinnati Reds on July 28, 1930, where Charlie Grimm is credited with two RBI in the game and Wilson with none. Ted Williams ranks second in walks behind Ruth, trailing by 43, while Rickey Henderson is third, 134 behind Ruth.

July
July 5 – The Cardinals defeat the Diamondbacks 1–0, as José Jiménez hurls a two-hitter to defeat Randy Johnson. Jiménez no-hit the Diamondbacks in his last appearance against them (June 25). Johnson loses his 3rd game in a row, during which Arizona does not score a run and only make three hits. He strikes out 12 Cardinals to tie Dwight Gooden's NL mark of 43 strikeouts over three starts. He also reaches 200 strikeouts for the year and ends St. Louis rookie Joe McEwing's 25-game hitting streak, the 5th-longest ever for a rookie.
July 6 – The White Sox lose to the Royals 8–7.
July 9 – The uniform Lou Gehrig wore when he made his famous "luckiest man on earth" speech on July 4, 1939 is sold for $451,541 at auction. Leland's spokesman Marty Appel says the flannel pinstripe uniform worn by the Hall of Fame first baseman is purchased by a South Florida man who does not want his name to be made public. The winning bid is made over the phone. The previous day, Carlton Fisk's home run ball that won Game Six of the 1975 World Series for the Boston Red Sox is sold for $113,273.
July 13:
The Major League Baseball All-Century Team is announced prior to the All-Star Game. Many members of the selected team, including Bob Gibson, Willie Mays, Brooks Robinson, Mike Schmidt and Ted Williams, are on the field for the festivities.
The American League defeats the National League, 4–1, to win the All-Star Game at Fenway Park in Boston. Red Sox pitcher Pedro Martínez is named the game's MVP as he strikes out the first four hitters to bat against him, and five of the six he faces in his two innings of work. The game begins 15 minutes late as Hall of Fame outfielder Teddy Williams rides out in a cart for the first-pitch ceremony. Players from both teams surround the former Red Sox star in a spontaneous display of homage.
July 15 – In the Seattle Mariners' first-ever game at Safeco Field, the San Diego Padres defeat the Mariners 3–2, scoring two runs in the top of the ninth to win.  Safeco Field is the first MLB stadium to open with an inter-league game.
July 18 – David Cone pitches a perfect game for the New York Yankees in a 6–0 win over the Montreal Expos. Don Larsen delivered the game's ceremonial first pitch in celebration of Yogi Berra Day at Yankee Stadium.
July 25 – George Brett, Robin Yount, Nolan Ryan and Orlando Cepeda are inducted into the Hall of Fame in Cooperstown, New York.

August
August 5 – The San Diego Padres defeat the Cardinals 10–3, despite a pair of home runs by Mark McGwire, including the 500th of his career. McGwire becomes the first player in history to hit his 400th and 500th homers in successive seasons.
August 6:
San Diego's Tony Gwynn joins the 3,000 hit club, becoming the 22nd player to do so.  Dan Smith of the Montréal Expos gives up the historic hit as Gwynn goes 4-for-5 in a 12–10 San Diego victory.
Carlos Delgado hits 3 home runs, helping the Toronto Blue Jays beat Texas Rangers 5–4.
August 7:
Just one day after Tony Gwynn reaches the historic milestone, the Tampa Bay Devil Rays' Wade Boggs also gets the 3,000th hit of his career in Tampa Bay's 15–10 loss to Cleveland. Besides, Boggs becomes the first player in history to hit a home run for his 3,000th hit.
The Toronto Blue Jays signed undrafted free agent Kevin Cash. Cash would achieve greater fame as the manager of the Tampa Bay Rays.
August 9 – A total of five grand slams are hit on the day, marking the first time it happens in 129 years of major league baseball. The bases-loaded pokes are hit by Fernando Tatís (St. Louis, against Philadelphia), José Vidro (Montreal, against San Diego), Mike Lowell (Florida, against San Francisco), Bernie Williams (Yankees, against Oakland) and Jay Buhner (Seattle, against the White Sox).
August 15 – In the first inning of a 10–2 victory over the Detroit Tigers at Tiger Stadium, Chuck Finley of the Anaheim Angels becomes the first pitcher to strike out four batters in one inning more than once. After Kimera Bartee leads off with a single, Finley strikes out Deivi Cruz; a wild pitch allows Bartee to advance to second base. Juan Encarnación and Dean Palmer fan next, the latter reaching base on Finley's second wild pitch, and finally, Finley strikes out Tony Clark to end the inning. Finley strikes out four batters in the third inning of a 1–0 victory over the New York Yankees on May 12 of this season; against the Texas Rangers on April 16, he records a third four-strikeout inning (the 3rd inning) while with the Cleveland Indians.
August 17 – St. Louis sends José Jiménez down to AAA Memphis less than two months after his no-hitter against Arizona. He joins Bobo Holloman as the only pitcher to go to the minors in the same year he pitched a no-hitter.
August 26 – Randy Johnson reaches 300 strikeouts in record time, notching nine in seven innings to help the Arizona Diamondbacks beat the Florida Marlins 12–2.
August 30:
The Mets roll over the Astros 17–1, as Edgardo Alfonzo goes 6-for-6, a club record, with a double, three home runs, five RBI and six runs scored. The six runs scored ties the modern major league mark. Alfonzo is only the fifth player ever to hit three home runs while going 6-for-6.
Former player Billy Bean comes out of the closet and announces his homosexuality. He is the first living player to publicly acknowledge that he is gay.

September
September 2 – Cal Ripken hits 400th career home run helping the Baltimore Orioles beat the Tampa Bay Devil Rays 11–6.
September 3 – Terry Collins resigns as manager of the Anaheim Angels. He is replaced by bench coach Joe Maddon.
September 4 – In a 22-3 blowout over the Philadelphia Phillies, the Cincinnati Reds tie an NL record by hitting nine home runs in the contest: two by Eddie Taubensee, and one apiece by Aaron Boone, Dmitri Young, Jeffrey Hammonds, Greg Vaughn, Pokey Reese, Brian Johnson and Mark Lewis.
September 7 – Two native Canadian pitchers oppose each other as starters for the first time in 26 years. Florida Marlins pitcher Ryan Dempster, from British Columbia, faces off against Los Angeles Dodgers pitcher Éric Gagné, from Quebec. The two go together while competing on Canada's national baseball team. The battle is a draw with neither pitcher getting the decision, but the Marlins win 2–1.
September 9 – In a game between the Expos and the Padres, umpires nearly allow 4 outs to be recorded in the 7th inning. Reggie Sanders of the Padres strikes out for the third out, but the umpires, the fans, and the Expos allow the Padres' Phil Nevin to come up to the plate and pitcher Ted Lilly to reach a 2-1 count before someone alerts home plate umpire Jerry Layne to the mistake. (Padres win 10–3)
September 10 – The Red Sox trip the Yankees 3–1, as Pedro Martínez hurls an impressive one-hitter for his 21st victory of the year. Martinez strikes out 17 batters, the most Yankees ever fanned in a single game. Chili Davis' 2nd-inning home run is NY's only safety. Chuck Knoblauch, hit by pitch leading off the game, gives the Yankees their only other baserunner; he is caught stealing, so Martínez faces just one over the minimum.
September 11 – The Twins defeat the Angels 7–0, as left-handed Eric Milton hurls the third no-hitter of the season.
September 14:
Kansas City loses a doubleheader to the Angels, 8–6 in the opener and 6–5 in the nightcap. In the second game, KC outfielder Mark Quinn makes a memorable major league debut. After making out in his first at bat, Quinn doubles in his next trip to the plate, then hits home runs in his last two times up. He becomes just the third player in history to hit two home runs in his first big league game. Bob Nieman and Bert Campaneris are the only others to accomplish the feat.
Bernie Williams hits an eighth-inning grand slam off Toronto Blue Jay pitcher Billy Koch to tie the game and Paul O'Neill hits a ninth-inning slam off Paul Spoljaric to give the New York Yankees a 10–6 win over The Blue Jays.
September 18:
The Brewers beat the Cubs, 7–4, as Sammy Sosa hits his 60th home run of the year. He becomes the first major leaguer to hit 60 homers twice.
Jim Morris of the Tampa Bay Devil Rays is called in to pitch relief against the Texas Rangers at The Ballpark in Arlington, striking out Royce Clayton.  Just months earlier, Morris was a high school science teacher and baseball coach.  His autobiography is the basis for the 2002 film The Rookie starring Dennis Quaid as Morris.
September 21 – The Red Sox defeat the Blue Jays, 3–0, as Pedro Martínez fans 12 for his 22nd win. He joins Randy Johnson as the only pitchers to strike out at least 300 in both leagues, and breaks Roger Clemens' club mark of 291 strikeouts.
September 26 – The Cardinals lose to the Reds 7–5, despite Mark McGwire's 60th home run of the season. McGwire joins Sammy Sosa as the only players in history to reach the 60 homer mark twice.
September 27 – The Tigers defeat the Royals 8–2 in the final game ever played at Tiger Stadium.
September 30 – The Los Angeles Dodgers defeat the San Francisco Giants 9–4, in the final baseball game ever played at Candlestick Park.

October
October 2 – In a 3–2 Yankees victory over Tampa Bay, Bernie Williams draws his 100th walk of the season. He is the second player (after John Olerud in 1993) since Stan Musial (1949 and 1953) to reach 200 hits, 100 runs, 100 RBI and 100 walks in a season. Williams finishes with 202, 116, 115 and 100, respectively.
October 3:
The Cardinals defeat the Cubs, 9–5, as both Mark McGwire and Sammy Sosa homer in their last game of the season. McGwire takes Steve Trachsel deep in the first inning and finishes with 65 home runs, with Sosa next in line with 63, homering in the third. McGwire's home run is his 522nd, moving him past Ted Williams and Willie McCovey for 10th place on the all-time list. He ends the season with 147 runs batted in on 145 hits, the only player in major league history (with 100 hits in a season) to have more RBI than hits. Jay Buhner, in 1995, comes closest with 121 RBI and 123 hits.
At the Astrodome, Jeff Bagwell of the Houston Astros becomes a two-time member of the 30–30 club. In the fifth inning of the Astros' 9–4 victory over the Los Angeles Dodgers, Bagwell, who has 42 home runs at this point, leads off with a base on balls, then steals second base for his 30th steal of the season.
October 4 – The New York Mets defeat the Cincinnati Reds 5–0 in an one-game playoff to win the National League wild card berth. As is the custom with Major League Baseball tie-breaking playoff games, the tie-breaking game is included in the clubs' season won-loss record.  Consequently, the Mets will finish the regular season with a 97–66 record and the Reds with a 96–67 record, one game more than the traditional 162-game regular-season schedule.
October 9 – The Houston Astros play their last game at the historic Houston Astrodome as they prepare to move into Enron Field, located in downtown Houston, for the  season. The Astros lose to the Atlanta Braves 7-5 as Atlanta advances to its 8th straight NLCS.
October 17 – In the top of the 15th inning of the National League Championship Series' Game 5, the Atlanta Braves take a 3–2 lead over the New York Mets. The Mets later come back to tie the game at three. Robin Ventura hits a grand slam home run to win the game, but the hit is credited as a single after the on-field celebration prevented Ventura from advancing past first.
October 22 – The New York Yankees sign minor league free agent Mike Coolbaugh. Though Coolbaugh never plays a game for the Yankees, he later becomes an unfortunate part of baseball history when he is killed during a minor league game when a line drive strikes him in the skull in 2007. After his death, coaches on the field began to wear helmets as a safety precaution.  
October 27 – The New York Yankees defeat the Atlanta Braves, 4–1, to win their 25th World Series. Roger Clemens gets the win, hurling 4-hit ball before leaving the game in the 8th inning. Mariano Rivera gets the save, his second of the Series. Jim Leyritz hits a solo home run in the 8th inning to finish the NY scoring. Rivera wins the Series MVP award.

November
November 1:
The Cubs hire Atlanta Braves coach Don Baylor as their new manager.
The Indians hire hitting coach Charlie Manuel as their new manager.
November 17 – The Angels hire Mike Scioscia as their new manager.
November 26 – Arbitrator Alan Symonette rejects the owners' attempt to dismiss the umpires' grievance, giving the 22 booted umps a chance to get their jobs back. Symonette will hear the grievance beginning December 13.
November 30 – Members of the umpires association vote 57–35 to form a new union, with one vote voided because a member signs his ballot. The NLRB certifies the election results in seven days, if there are no objections. But, Jerry Crawford, the president of the old union, says objections are likely to be filed.

December
December 5 – Major League Baseball and ESPN agree to settle their lawsuit by signing a new 6-year, $800 million deal. The suit involves ESPN's decision to give National Football League games priority over late-season Sunday Night Baseball games on its main channel.

Movies
 For Love of the Game

Births

January
January 2 – Fernando Tatís Jr.
January 16 – Andrés Muñoz
January 21 – Matt Sauer
January 27 – Luis Ortiz
January 30 – Brailyn Márquez

February
February 7 – Kervin Castro
February 13 – Gilberto Celestino
February 15 – Esteury Ruiz
February 18 – Isaac Paredes
February 18 – Ryan Vilade
February 24 – MacKenzie Gore
February 25 – Rafael Marchan
February 27 – Adrian Morejón

March
March 1 – Oswaldo Cabrera
March 8 – Cal Mitchell
March 11 – Sherten Apostel
March 12 – Max Meyer
March 16 – Vladimir Guerrero Jr.

April
April 8 – Jo Adell
April 26 – Héctor Yan
April 30 – Canaan Smith-Njigba

May
May 3 – Luis Medina
May 4 – Max Castillo
May 15 – Luis Oviedo
May 17 – Brayan Bello
May 19 – Bryce Elder
May 19 – Deivi García
May 20 – J.T. Ginn
May 21 – Rodolfo Castro
May 21 – Tyler Freeman
May 22 – Ezequiel Durán

June
June 5 – Royce Lewis
June 17 – Shane Baz
June 20 – Anthony Seigler
June 21 – Garrett Crochet
June 24 – Christopher Morel

July
July 8 – Reid Detmers
July 16 – Jarred Kelenic
July 16 – Mike Siani
July 26 – Ji-hwan Bae

August
August 6 – Hunter Greene
August 6 – Matt McLain
August 8 – Mason Denaburg
August 9 – Xavier Edwards
August 12 – Joe Perez
August 25 – Eguy Rosario
August 26 – Spencer Torkelson
August 28 – Gregory Santos

September
September 7 – Heliot Ramos
September 16 – Tucupita Marcano
September 27 – Ángel Zerpa

October
October 8 – Connor Scott
October 18 – Jordyn Adams
October 22 – Geraldo Perdomo
October 26 – Luis Patiño
October 27 – Francisco Morales

November
November 2 – Carter Stewart
November 6 – Matthew Liberatore
November 7 – Roansy Contreras
November 10 – Jordan Groshans
November 13 – Brett Baty
November 16 – Grayson Rodriguez
November 17 – Miguel Vargas
November 21 – Brice Turang
November 25 – Cole Winn

December
December 7 – José Devers
December 11 – Mark Vientos
December 17 – Ryan Weathers

Deaths

January
January   1 – Len Dondero, 95, backup infielder for the St. Louis Browns in the 1929 season.
January   6 – Jim Dunn, 67, pitcher for the 1952 Pittsburgh Pirates.
January 11 – Jim Dyck, 76, left fielder and third baseman for the St. Louis Browns, Cleveland Indians, Baltimore Orioles and Cincinnati Reds between 1951 and 1956.
January 15 – Oscar Georgy, 82,  pitcher who appeared in just one game for the New York Giants in 1938.
January 25 – Bob Hartsfield, 67, former minor-league infielder who spent 48 years in baseball, serving as an MLB scout and minor-league manager and as director of scouting of the San Francisco Giants, 1994–1997; brother of Roy Hartsfield.
January 26 – Larry Loughlin, 57, pitcher for the 1967 Philadelphia Phillies.
January 31 – Norm Zauchin, 69, who hit 27 home runs with 93 RBI in 130 games as a 1955 rookie for the Boston Red Sox, also leading the American League first basemen with a .995 fielding percentage, while hitting three home runs with one double and 10 RBI in a single game, and ending 3rd in AL Rookie of the Year voting behind Herb Score and Billy Klaus.

February
February   1 – Paul Calvert, 81, Canadian pitcher for the Cleveland Indians, Washington Senators and Detroit Tigers over all or parts of seven seasons spanning 1942–1951.
February   3 – Leo Schrall, 91, player and manager in the Minor Leagues, as well as a famed head coach at Bradley University.
February   8 – Carl Sumner, 90, backup outfielder who played with the Boston Red Sox in 1928, becoming the youngest player to join the American League in that season at 19 years, 301 days of age.
February 12 – Jimmy Dudley, 89, broadcaster for the Cleveland Indians from 1948 to 1967 and the voice of the Seattle Pilots during their only major-league season (1969); early in his career, called games for the Chicago Cubs and White Sox.
February 20 – Buck Rogers, 86, pitcher who played for the Washington Senators in 1935.
February 20 – Joe Rossi, 78, catcher who played for the Cincinnati Reds in 1952, serving as the primary backup for incumbent Andy Seminick. 
February 21 – George Gill, 90, pitcher who He played for the Detroit Tigers and St. Louis Browns in a span of three seasons from 1937 to 1939.
February 21 – Vinegar Bend Mizell, 68, All-Star pitcher who won 90 games for the St. Louis Cardinals and Pittsburgh Pirates, and later served as a Congressman.
February 24 – Johnnie Wittig, 84, pitcher who played from 1938 through 1949 for the New York Giants and Boston Red Sox.
February 25 – Earl Huckleberry, 88, pitcher for the Philadelphia Athletics in the 1935 season.
February 28 – Kenny Robinson, 29, relief pitcher for the Toronto Blue Jays and Kansas City Royals in part of three seasons spanning 1995–1997, who was killed in a car accident while attending spring training camp with the Arizona Diamondbacks.

March
March  8 – Joe DiMaggio, 84, Hall of Fame center fielder for the New York Yankees, who batted .325 lifetime, won three MVP awards (1939, 1941, 1947) and had a record 56-game hitting streak in 1941, while playing in 13 All-Star Games and  nine World Series champion teams; collecting seven years of 30 home runs and nine with 100 RBI; leading AL in batting, slugging, home runs and RBI twice each; runs and triples once each, as his 361 HRs were 5th-most upon retirement and his .579 slugging average ranked sixth all-time.
March  8 – William Wrigley Jr., 66, owner of the Chicago Cubs from 1977 to 1981, who later sold the team to the Tribune Company, ending 60 years of family operation.
March 10 – Alta Little, 75, All-American Girls Professional Baseball League player.
March  13 – Bill Peterman,  77, Philadelphia Phillies catcher who went 1-for-1 in his only appearance in the majors on September 28, 1958.
March 20 – Paul Toth, 63, pitcher who played from 1962 through 1964 with the St. Louis Cardinals and Chicago Cubs. 
March 24 – Birdie Tebbetts, 86, All-Star catcher for the Detroit Tigers and Boston Red Sox noted for his outspokenness, who also managed three teams and was AP Manager of the Year with 1956 Cincinnati Redlegs; later, scouted for 28 years.
March 25 – Cal Ripken Sr., 63, longtime coach and manager in the Baltimore Orioles system, and father of future Hall of Famer Cal Jr.; managed Orioles from 1987 through April 11, 1988.
March 31 – Ike Kahdot, 99, third baseman for the 1922 Cleveland Indians, who at the time of his death was the oldest living former major league player.

April
April   1 – Red Flaherty, 81, American League umpire from 1953 to 1973 who was chosen to work in four World Series and three All-Star Games over 21 seasons.
April   4 – Early Wynn, 79, Hall of Fame pitcher for the Washington Senators, Cleveland Indians and Chicago White Sox, who won 300 games, top mark for the American League pitchers of his generation, as his 1959 Cy Young season was among five 20-win campaigns, while leading the league in innings three times, strikeouts twice and ERA once.
April   9 – Clay Bryant, 87, pitcher who posted a 32–20 record with 3.73 ERA for the Chicago Cubs from 1931 to 1940, including 19 victories and a National League lead with 135 strikeouts in 1938; later a minor league manager and MLB coach for the Los Angeles Dodgers and Cleveland Indians. 
April   9 – Jerold Hoffberger, 80, chairman and principal owner of the Baltimore Orioles from 1965 to 1979, a period in which the Orioles won four American League pennants and two World Series titles, plus a fifth pennant just after he sold the team to Edward Bennett Williams before the 1980 season.
April 11 – Pete Milne, 74, outfielder for the New York Giants between the 1948 and 1950 seasons.
April 12 – Cliff Ross, 70, pitcher for the 1954 Cincinnati Redlegs.
April 15 – Bernie Snyder, 85, middle infielder who played in 1935 with the Philadelphia Athletics.
April 16 – Kaoru Betto, 78, Hall of Fame Japanese Baseball League and NPB outfielder and manager who played for the Osaka Tigers and Mainichi Orions from 1948 to 1957 and managed four teams
April 26 – Faye Throneberry, 67, valuable backup outfielder for the Boston Red Sox, Washington Senators and Los Angeles Angels in a span of eight seasons from 1952 to 1960; elder brother of Marv Throneberry.

May
May   3 – Joe Adcock, 71, All-Star first baseman, mainly for the Milwaukee Braves; twice hit 35 home runs, had four home runs and a double for 18 total bases in a 1954 game, and ruined Harvey Haddix's epic 1959 no-hit bid with a 13th-inning homer; manager of 1967 Cleveland Indians.
May 10 – Carl Powis, 71, right fielder for the 1957 Baltimore Orioles.
May 11 – Ben Taylor, 71, first baseman who played for the St. Louis Browns, Detroit Tigers and Milwaukee Braves in a span of three seasons from 1951 to 1955. 	
May 30 – Clarence Heise, 91, pitcher who appeared in just one game for the St. Louis Cardinals during the 1934 season.

June
June 3 – Charlene Pryer, 77, All-American Girls Professional League All-Star infielder who set several records in a seven-season career and also served during World War II.
June 6 – Eddie Stanky, 82, All-Star second baseman for five National League teams, who led the league in walks three times and runs once; managed the St. Louis Cardinals, Chicago White Sox and (for one game in 1977) Texas Rangers; longtime head baseball coach of the University of South Alabama.
June 7 – Bob Garber, 70, pitcher for the 1956 Pittsburgh Pirates.
June 15 – Gene Markland, 79, second baseman who played for the Philadelphia Athletics in 1950, whose baseball career was interrupted by four years of wartime service in the armed forces.
June 23 – Bert Haas, 85, All-Star first baseman who played with five National League during nine seasons from 1937 to 1951, most prominently for the Cincinnati Reds between 1942 and 1947, and later managed in the Minor Leagues from 1955 to 1961.
June 24 – Takehiko Bessho, 76, Hall of Fame pitcher and manager that played for the Nankai/Great Ring/Nankai Hawks and the Yomiuri Giants from 1942 to 1960 and managed the Sankei Atoms/Atoms/Yakult Atoms for three season from 1968 to 1970.
June 25 – Charlie English, 89, third baseman who played for the Chicago White Sox, New York Giants and Cincinnati Reds in all or part of four seasons spanning 1932–1937.
June 26 – Tim Layana, 35, pitcher who played for the Cincinnati Reds and San Francisco Giants in three seasons from 1990 to 1993, as well as a member of the 1990 World Series Champion Reds team.

July
July   8 – José Antonio Casanova, 80, the most successful manager in Venezuelan baseball history, who won five Venezuelan league titles and led his teams to several international titles in a career that spanned more than three decades.
July 13 – Irene Ruhnke, 79, infielder and outfielder who played in the All-American Girls Professional Baseball League from 1943 through 1947.
July 16 – Whit Wyatt, 91, four-time All-Star pitcher best known for winning 22 in games in 1941 to lead the Brooklyn Dodgers to the National League pennant, before winning the only game against the New York Yankees in the 1941 World Series; longtime pitching coach. 
July 18 – Woody Davis, 86, pitcher who played in two games for the Detroit Tigers in 1938.
July 28 – Ed Cole, 90, pitcher who played for the St. Louis Browns in the 1938 and 1939 seasons.

August
August   8 – Harry Walker, 80, "Harry the Hat", two-time NL All-Star center fielder; appeared in 807 games for four clubs, including the St. Louis Cardinals and Philadelphia Phillies, between 1940 and 1955 and a member of 1942 and 1946 world champion Cardinals; won 1947 National League batting title; later managed for 20 years, including nine seasons in MLB with Cardinals, Pittsburgh Pirates and Houston Astros, and a longtime coach.
August 14 – Evelyn Adams, 75, All-American Girls Professional Baseball League shortstop.
August 14 – Pat Mullin, 81, two-time All-Star outfielder for the Detroit Tigers in 10 seasons between 1940 and 1953; a member of the 1940 American League champions Tigers; coach for Detroit (1963–1966), Cleveland Indians (1967) and Montreal Expos (1979–1981).
August 14 – Pee Wee Reese, 81, Hall of Fame shortstop and leadoff hitter and captain of the Brooklyn and Los Angeles Dodgers in 16 seasons from 1946 to 1959; a 10-time All-Star who played on seven National League pennant winners and two World Series champion teams; three times hitting over .300 in the series, while leading the league in runs, walks and steals once each and in putouts four times, before retiring with MLB career-record for double plays (1246) and 5th-most games at shortstop (2014), despite missing three years in World War II; after his playing career, longtime broadcaster for Baseball's Game of the Week.
August 15 – Greek George, 86, backup catcher who played for the Cleveland Indians, Brooklyn Dodgers, Chicago Cubs and Philadelphia Athletics in a span of five seasons from 1935 to 1945.
August 17 – Randy Heflin, 80, pitcher for the Boston Red Sox in the early 1940s.
August 19 – Dee Fondy, 84, first baseman for the Pittsburgh Pirates, Cincinnati Reds and Chicago Cubs from 1951 to 1958, who is credited as the last major league player to bat in the final game at Ebbets Field; later a longtime scout.
August 28 – Johnny Gerlach, 82, shortstop for the Chicago White Sox in the 1938 and 1939 seasons.
August 28 – Dave Pope, 78, All-Star outfielder in the Negro leagues, later a big leaguer with the Cleveland Indians and Baltimore Orioles during four seasons spanning 1952–1956.
August 30 – Warren Huston, 85, infield utility man for the 1937 Philadelphia  Athletics and the 1944 Boston Braves.

September
September   1 – Doc Marshall, 93, backup infielder who played from 1929 through 1932 for the New York Giants.
September   1 – Boots Poffenberger, 84, pitcher for the Detroit Tigers and Brooklyn Dodgers during four seasons from 1937 to 1939.
September   4 – Erma Keyes, 73, All-American Girls Professional Baseball League player.
September   9 – Jim "Catfish" Hunter, 53, Hall of Fame pitcher who posted five straight 20-win seasons for the Oakland Athletics and New York Yankees, winning the Cy Young Award in 1974 while totaling over 200 wins at age 30, a perfect game in 1968, as well as a 4–0 record with a 2.19 ERA in three World Series with the Athletics.
September 13 – Bill Lohrman, 86, pitcher for five different National League clubs from 1934 through 1944, most prominently with the New York Giants between the 1937 and 1943 seasons.
September 16 – Doug Hansen, 70, who appeared in three games as a pinch runner for the Cleveland Indians in 1951.
September 16 – Paul Gregory, 91, pitcher who played with the Chicago White Sox in 1932 and 1933, and later became a successful coach at Mississippi State University.
September 16 – Ace Williams, 82, pitcher who played for the Boston Bees in 1940 and the Boston Braves in 1946.
September 29 – Arnold Earley, 66, pitcher who played from 1960 through 1967 for the Boston Red Sox, Chicago Cubs and Houston Astros.
September 30 – Nels Potter, 79, pitcher for the St. Louis Cardinals, Philadelphia Athletics, Boston Red Sox, St. Louis Browns and Boston Braves from 1936 to 1949, who posted a 19–7 record with a 2.83 ERA in 1944 to lead the Browns to their only American League title.

October
October   3 – Paul Burris, 76, catcher who appeared in 69 games for the Boston Braves and Milwaukee Braves in a span of four seasons from 1948 to 1953.
October   6 – Bob Patrick, 81, outfielder who played for the Detroit Tigers in the 1941 and 1942 seasons.
October   9 – Dutch Dotterer, 67, catcher who played for the Cincinnati Redlegs/Reds from 1957 to 1960, and the expansion Washington Senators in 1961.
October 13 – Tex Aulds, 78, backup catcher who played in three games for the Boston Red Sox in the 1947 season.
October 19 – Ray Katt, 72, catcher for the New York Giants and St. Louis Cardinals from 1952 to 1959, later head baseball coach at Texas Lutheran University for 22 years.
October 20 – Calvin Griffith, 87, succeeded uncle Clark Griffith as majority owner, president and de facto general manager of the Washington Senators and their successor, the Minnesota Twins, serving from October 27, 1955, to August 15, 1984; responsible for moving the Senators to Minnesota after the 1960 season.
October 20 – Earl Turner, 76, catcher for the Pittsburgh Pirates between 1948 and 1950.
October 30 – Max Patkin, 79, best known as the 'Clown Prince of Baseball', who entertained fans for over 50 years.

November
November   1 – Pat McLaughlin, 89, pitcher who played for the Detroit Tigers, Philadelphia Athletics and Detroit Tigers in part of three seasons between 1937 and 1945. 
November 13 – Ray Goolsby, 80, outfielder who played in three games for the 1946 Washington Senators.
November 16 – Allen Benson, 94, pitcher for the Washington Senators during the 1934 season.
November 18 – Jay Heard, 79, pitcher for the Baltimore Orioles in 1954.
November 25 – Twila Shively, 79, All-American Girls Professional Baseball League outfielder from 1945 through 1950.
November 28 – Dick Errickson, 87, pitcher who played from 1938 through 1942 for the Boston Bees, Boston Braves and Chicago Cubs.
November 29 – Tom Herrin, 70, who pitched for the 1954 Boston Red Sox.
November 30 – Al Schroll, 67, pitcher for the Boston Red Sox, Philadelphia Phillies, Chicago Cubs and Minnesota Twins from 1958 to 1961.

December
December  1 – Gene Baker, 74, All-Star second baseman who played for the Chicago Cubs and the Pittsburgh Pirates during eight seasons between 1953 and 1961.
December  2 – Mike Budnick, 80, pitcher who appeared in 42 games for the New York Giants in the 1946 and 1947 seasons.
December  6 – Roy Talcott, 79, pitcher who played for the 1943 Boston Braves.
December  8 – Wally Hebert, 92, pitcher who played from 1931 through 1933 with the St. Louis Browns and for the Pittsburgh Pirates in 1943.
December  9 – Whitey Kurowski, 81, a five-time All-Star third baseman who played for the St. Louis Cardinals from 1941 to 1949.
December 15 – Eddie Kazak, 79, All-Star third baseman who played from 1948 through 1952 for the St. Louis Cardinals and Cincinnati Reds.
December 20 – Dick Bertell, 64, backup catcher who played for the Chicago Cubs and San Francisco Giants in seven seasons between 1960 and 1967.
December 29 – Fred Saigh, 94, co-owner (1947–1949) and sole owner (1949–1953) of the St. Louis Cardinals; forced to sell the Redbirds after he pleaded no-contest to tax evasion charges, he kept the team in St. Louis by accepting the lower bid of August A. Busch Jr., who would own it until 1989.
December 31 – Larry Bearnarth, 58, relief pitcher for the New York Mets from 1963 to 1966, later a pitching coach for the Montreal Expos and Colorado Rockies.
December 31 – Harry Kimberlin, 90, pitcher who played from 1936 to 1939 with the St. Louis Browns.

See also

Sources

External links
Major League Baseball official website 
Minor League Baseball official website 
Baseball Almanac – Major League Baseball Players Who Died in 1999